KCO may refer to:

Music
KCO, the former stage name of Keiko (musician)
Kings Chamber Orchestra, a chamber orchestra based in the United Kingdom
Royal Concertgebouw Orchestra, a symphony orchestra based in Amsterdam

Other uses
Agip KCO, a division of Agip operating in the Kazakhstan (northern) sector of the Caspian Sea 
Cengiz Topel Naval Air Station (IATA code KCO), a Turkish Navy air station and civil airport in Kocaeli Province, Turkey